The French post offices abroad were a global network of post offices in foreign countries established by France to provide mail service where the local services were deemed unsafe or unreliable.  They were generally set up in cities with some sort of French commercial interest.

They started appearing in the early 19th century, reached their heyday at the beginning of the 20th century, then started closing down in the 1910s and 1920s, with the office at Kwangchou in China holding out until the 1940s.

Offices abroad:
 French post offices in China
 French post offices in Crete
 French post offices in Egypt
 French post offices in the Ottoman Empire
 French post offices in Zanzibar

Sources 
 Stanley Gibbons Ltd: various catalogues
 AskPhil – Glossary of Stamp Collecting Terms
 Encyclopaedia of Postal History
Rossiter, Stuart & John Flower. The Stamp Atlas. London: Macdonald, 1986.

External links
https://web.archive.org/web/20100918014836/http://www.rpsl.org.uk/indochina/index.html

Postage stamps of France
Postal system of France